Ninia atrata, known commonly as Hallowell's coffee snake, Hallowell's earth snake, the red-nape snake, and the South American coffee snake, is a species of small terrestrial snake in the family Colubridae. The species is native to southern Central America and northern South America.

Geographic range
N. atrata is found in Colombia, Ecuador, Panama, Trinidad and Tobago, and Venezuela.

Habitat

Diet
N. atrata is believed to feed on insect larvae, termites and slugs.

Reproduction
N. atrata is oviparous.

References

Further reading
Angarita-Sierra T (2017). "Ninia atrata (Hallowell 1845), Viejita". Catálogo de anfibios y reptiles de Colombia 3 (2): 30–37. (in Spanish).
Freiberg M (1982). Snakes of South America. Hong Kong: T.F.H. Publications. 189 pp. . (Ninia atrata, p. 104).
Hallowell E (1845). "Description of Reptiles from South America, supposed to be new". Proceedings of the Academy of Natural Sciences of Philadelphia 2: 241–247. (Coluber atratus, new species, pp. 245–246).
La Marca E, Esqueda LF, Manzanilla J (2004). "[Geographic Distribution:] Ninia atrata (Hallowell's Earth Snake; Culebra de Tierra; Viejita)". Herpetological Review 35 (2): 192.
https://serpientesdevenezuela.org/ninia-atrata/

Ninia
Reptiles of Trinidad and Tobago
Reptiles of Panama
Reptiles of Venezuela
Taxa named by Edward Hallowell (herpetologist)
Reptiles described in 1848